The Celebrity Solstice is the lead ship of the  of cruise ships operated by Celebrity Cruises. Built by Meyer Werft in Papenburg, Germany, she was floated out on 10 August 2008, and christened by ocean scientist Professor Sharon L. Smith at a ceremony in Fort Lauderdale, Florida, United States, on 14 November 2008. The first post-Panamax vessel in the Celebrity fleet, she features innovative interior design and onboard amenities, including an ocean-going live grass lawn, a glassblowing studio, and a 12 deck-high atrium.

Design and description
Externally, Celebrity Solstice looks very different from previous Celebrity Cruises ships. Martin Francis of Francis Design was hired to design her exterior profile. In original exterior renderings, the hull was shown as all-white with powder blue funnels and blue glass upper decks. In a more recent update, the light blue color had been changed to Celebrity's normal dark blue color and the hull was shown having a resemblance to the current fleet's livery, with the promenade deck painted dark blue. Similarly, the large dark blue funnel with a white X that had been the trademark of Celebrity thus far has been replaced by two thin funnels, and it was planned to have the X logo of the company visible in the glass balcony railings on the ship's "hump" (The area of superstructure which extends outward farther than the rest of the balconies). Throughout her fitting out, sea trials, and launch, it was noted that the glass X, unless seen from certain angles, was not visible. Shortly after, the X was refinished to be darker, but still can be hard to see. An afterthought during the sea trials saw the addition of a white X onto the forward funnel, thus bringing Celebrity Solstice more closely related to her fleetmates.

Facilities
Her facilities include a theater with a 1,400+ seating capacity and a live grass lawn between the ship's funnels on the upper deck and even a workout room, sauna, indoor pool, and more than four hot tubs.

Construction and career

Celebrity Solstice left Meyer Werft on September 28, 2008, and arrived in Fort Lauderdale on November 3, 2008. Subsequently, she embarked on a series of short preview cruises for travel agents and dignitaries. On November 14, 2008, at Port Everglades, Fort Lauderdale, she was officially named by Sharon L. Smith.  She began commercial service on November 23, 2008.

Celebrity Solstice was scheduled to be put in dry dock in October 2021.

2020: spread of COVID-19

In March 2020 thousands of passengers of cruise ships that disembarked in Sydney, Australia were told to self-isolate due to COVID-19 fears. Celebrity Solstice disembarked its passengers on 20 March. On 2 April 11 cases had tested positively for the virus in New South Wales alone. One passenger was reported to have died on 1 April.

The ship left Australia during the weekend of 4 April 2020 with its crew as did four other vessels.

References

Bibliography

External links

 Official website

 

Solstice
Ships built in Papenburg
2008 ships
Cruise ships involved in the COVID-19 pandemic